Thomas Matthews (16 August 1884 – 20 October 1969) was a British cyclist. He won a gold medal at the 1906 Intercalated Games and competed in two events at the 1908 Summer Olympics.

References

External links
 

1884 births
1969 deaths
British male cyclists
Olympic cyclists of Great Britain
Cyclists at the 1906 Intercalated Games
Cyclists at the 1908 Summer Olympics
Sportspeople from Kensington
Cyclists from Greater London
Medalists at the 1906 Intercalated Games